The 2008 Oregon Ducks football team represented the University of Oregon in the 2008 NCAA Division I FBS football season. This was the final season for Mike Bellotti as the Ducks' head coach; he was promoted to become the school's athletic director after the season. The Ducks played their home games at Autzen Stadium. They finished the season 10–3, 7–2 in Pac-10 play, and were invited to the Holiday Bowl where they defeated Oklahoma State 42–31.

Previous season
The 2007 Oregon Ducks played a surprisingly successful 2007, reaching a #2 ranking in the AP poll, Coaches poll and the BCS poll and finishing the season with a #23 ranking in the AP poll and a #24 ranking in the Coaches poll. Highlights of the season include a 39–7 victory over the Michigan Wolverines in Ann Arbor, Michigan (completing a home and away sweep which included a win against Michigan in Eugene, Oregon in 2003), a dramatic win against USC, and a 56–21 win against South Florida in the Brut Sun Bowl. Unfortunately for the Ducks, quarterback Dennis Dixon suffered a knee injury during the game against the Arizona Wildcats. At the time, Oregon had attained the #2 ranking in the nation and appeared to be headed for the national championship game in January. After Dixon's injury the Ducks lost their final 3 games of the regular season, resulting in a disappointing finish to the Oregon football season.

Pre-season
February 2 – Gary Zimmerman, offensive lineman for the Oregon Ducks during the 1980–83 seasons, was voted into the National Football League Hall of Fame in Canton, Ohio. This induction marks the sixth former Oregon player to be selected into the Hall of Fame.

April 4 – Nick Reed named to the Lott Trophy watch list. The trophy is awarded to the best collegiate defensive player each year.

April 18 – Fenuki Tupou and Max Unger named to the Outland Trophy watch list. The trophy is awarded to the best interior lineman each year.

April 27 – In the University of Oregon spring game the white team defeated the green team 36–3. The game featured breakout plays by Justin Roper, Ed Dickson and LeGarrette Blount.

April 30 – In the NFL draft, three players are selected, Jonathan Stewart selected 13th overall to the Carolina Panthers, Dennis Dixon selected in the 5th round by the Pittsburgh Steelers, and Geoff Schwartz also going to the Panthers in the 7th round. Two other players were signed as free agents, Cameron Colvin with the San Francisco 49ers and David Faaeteete with the Chicago Bears.

May 12 – Patrick Chung and Nick Reed named to the Bronko Nagurski Trophy pre-season watch list. The award is given to the best defensive player in college football each year.

May 13 – Max Unger named to the Dave Rimington Trophy pre-season watch list. The award is given to the outstanding NCAA Division I-A offensive center.

June 30 – Jaison Williams was named to the Maxwell Football Club Award watch list. The Maxwell Award is presented to the most outstanding player of the year. Also, Jairus Byrd, Patrick Chung and Walter Thurmond III were named to the Chuck Bednarik Award watch list. The award is given to the best defensive player of the year.

July 7 – Jairus Byrd, Patrick Chung, and Walter Thurmond III named to the Jim Thorpe Award pre-season watch list. The award is given to the best defensive back in college football each year. Oregon is the only school to have more than two nominees.

July 13 – While swimming in the McKenzie River with some of his teammates, redshirt freshman defensive back Todd Doxey drowned. The accident occurred around 3:15 in the afternoon near the Marcola Road Bridge and he was pronounced dead at Sacred Heart Medical Center at 8:06 PM.

July 26 – Junior linebacker Kevin Garrett was suspended indefinitely for a violation of team rules. Garrett finished the 2007 season with 21 tackles with 5.5 for a loss.

July 31 – Junior Ed Dickson has been named to the John Mackey Award watchlist, Dickson is one of 30 players named. The award is given to the Tight End who better exemplifies play, academics and sportsmanship.

August 18 – Senior Nick Reed has been named to the Walter Camp Football Foundation Player of the Year award list. The Walter Camp Football Foundation has named 35 player for consideration.

August 25 – It was announced by GoDucks.com that sophomore quarterback Nate Costa had re-injured his left knee during a practice on the preceding Wednesday. Current estimates place his recovery at eight to ten weeks, however the status of his ACL and MCL will be determined at the time of his surgery. This news means that redshirt sophomore Justin Roper will more than likely be the starter, and is expected to be challenged by sophomore transfer Jeremiah Masoli.

Recruiting class
As of July 11, 2008, the University of Oregon had signed four junior college transfers and 16 high school seniors.

Schedule

University of Oregon official schedule

Game summaries

Washington

Oregon won at Washington last year for the first time since 1997 and has won four in a row over the Huskies for the first time since 1931.

Last season it was the Duck offense that led Oregon to a 55–34 win over the Huskies. This year a combination of that same lightning quick offense and nearly shut-down defense is what earned the 44–10 win against Washington. Huskies quarterback Jake Locker, who had 335 yards of total offense last year, was only able to add 160 total yards for his offense, 103 passing and 57 running.

Although the big story for the Ducks coming into the game was how quarterback Justin Roper would fare after Nate Costa reinjured his left knee in the week of practices leading up to the game. It was discovered just three days before the game that he would miss his second consecutive season after sitting out all of last season. Roper, whose only experience starting an NCAA game was the Sun Bowl last season, did just as well as any could have hoped, leading the Ducks to a 7–0 lead within a minute and a half of the Duck's first possession.

However, during the second quarter, team doctors observed that Roper was showing symptoms of a concussion and was removed from the game. Coach Mike Bellotti then turned the game over to junior college transfer Jeremiah Masoli, who finished the game with 126 yards passing and 2 touchdowns. Coach Belotti has reported that he expects Roper to be 100% for the game against Utah State on September 6.

Notable performances include Masoli's 126 yards of passing and 2 touchdowns on 9 completions, running back Jeremiah Johnson ran for a total of 124 yards and 2 touchdowns on 15 carries and wide receiver Terrence Scott had 117 yards receiving and a touchdown on 6 receptions. This win also marks the first time in the  Oregon-Washington series, dating back to 1900, that Oregon has won 5 consecutive games against the Huskies.

Utah State
Oregon is 3-0 against Utah State with the most recent meeting occurring in 2001.

There was some speculation heading into the game about the health of Justin Roper. Roper had suffered a concussion during the Washington game and stopped play half way through the second quarter. By halftime there was very little concern of his health as Oregon took a 38–14 lead into the locker room. However during Oregon's first possession, running back Jeremiah Johnson separated his shoulder and Roper threw his second interception of the season. Despite this Roper was able to lead the Ducks to five consecutive scoring drives.

Top performances are: Justin Roper completing 13 of 18 passes for 173 yards and 1 touchdown, LeGarrette Blount rushing 132 yards and 2 touchdowns on 18 carries and Jeffrey Maehl completing 4 receptions for 72 yards. During the game, the Ducks had 688 yards of total offense which set a school record for yards of offense in one game. The previous record was 667 against BYU in 1989.

Purdue

Oregon lost at Purdue 13-7 in their only meeting in 1979.  These two teams played again in Eugene during the 2009 season.

Considered by some to be Oregon's first test of the year, the Ducks, along with several mistakes, found out that this was almost too much for them to handle. Immediately surrendering the first points of the game to Purdue's Kory Sheets on an 80-yard touchdown run that was the second play of the game and turning the ball over twice in the first quarter resulted in a 20–3 deficit very early in the game. However, the Ducks were able to keep some of its offensive prowess, out gaining the Boilermakers 282 to 195 yards. It was the inability to put together a good drive that kept the Ducks down.

With the score in favor of Purdue 20–6, Oregon was able to score twice to even the score. The first came on an 87-yard punt return from Jairus Byrd and the second on a 96-yard drive that featured a 72-yard run by LeGarrette Blount. Both teams scored a field goal each in the fourth quarter leaving the game tied 23–23 at the end of regulation. Purdue did attempt a 44-yard field goal with :02 left on the clock, but that try was missed. In the first over time both Oregon and Purdue could do no better than a field goal and during the second over time Oregon's defense, which had work so efficiently throughout the game, forced the Boilermakers to attempt a 47-yard field goal, which was missed. On the Ducks' possession of the overtime Chris Harper, Jeremiah Johnson and LeGarrette Blount all took turns running Oregon into the end zone for the game-winning touchdown.

During the Oregon possession of the first overtime, quarterback Justin Roper suffered a sprained knee and is currently expected to be out for two to four weeks. This means that for the Boise State game Oregon will be starting its third-string quarterback for only the third game of the year.

Top performers during the game are: Justin Roper completing 20 of 48 passes for 197 yards, LeGarrette Blount rushing for 132 yards and two touchdowns on 10 carries and tight end Ed Dickson catching seven passes for 93 yards.

Boise State

First ever meeting between the schools; Oregon traveled to Boise for the first time the next year in the 2009 season.

Highlights of the game: Quarterback Kellen Moore (BSU) had 386 yards passing, running back LeGarrette Blount (ORE) rushed for 99 yards, and tight end Ed Dickson (ORE) received 103 yards.

Washington State

Oregon defeated Washington State 53-7 in Eugene last year, however, in 2008, the teams will be playing in Pullman and Washington State has hired a new coaching staff.

Projected to have a 48–14 win, the Oregon Ducks certainly spoiled the homecoming of the Washington State Cougars. Three touchdowns in the first five minutes of play made this game unreachable for the Cougars. The Ducks never slowed down, scoring on a majority of their possessions, leaving Pullman with a 63–14 win. Jeremiah Masoli started for the Ducks. Running backs Jeremiah Johnson and LeGarrette Blount each ran for three touchdowns, while wide receiver Jaison Williams caught two touchdown passes, from Masoli.

USC

Coming off an emotional win against USC last year the Ducks will look to make it two in a row over the Trojans in Los Angeles.

The Ducks scored on the first possession of the game to lead 7–0 via a Jeremiah Johnson touchdown run.  The Ducks led 10–3 in the second quarter, but a scoring explosion late in the second quarter on the part of the Trojans gave them a commanding 27–10 halftime lead.  Oregon did not manage to score in the second half and went on to lose 44–10.  Oregon's Jeremiah Johnson scored what would be the only touchdown given up by USC at home for the entire 2008 season

UCLA

The Ducks lost 16-0 last year in Los Angeles. It was Oregon's first time being shut-out since 1985 (at Nebraska).

After losing to the Bruins 16–0 in Los Angeles the year before, the Ducks beat the Bruins in Eugene 31–24.  The Ducks took a 14–0 lead into the half and hung on to win in the second half.  Jeremiah Masoli rushed for 170 yards and a touchdown.)

Arizona State

    
    
    
    
    
    
    
    
    
    
    
    

The Ducks have won the previous three meetings against the Sun Devils (including the last two in Tempe) by an average of 15 points per game.

California

Oregon faced an unranked Cal team on the road during a rainy day in Berkeley with Kevin Riley as the starter. Oregon capitalized on an interception at midfield on Cal's first possession with a 17-yard run by Jeremiah Masoli with the PAT missing. The Bears responded quickly with a 22-yard pass from Riley to Jeremy Ross on the ensuing possession. Jahvid Best was able to break free for a 50-yard run from the Cal 20, but fumbled the ball in Ducks territory. The Bears held the Ducks and got a safety when Oregon snapped the ball high and into the end zone on a punt attempt. Cal took advantage of the free kick to advance down the field, during which Riley sustained a concussion when he failed to slide while attempting to gain a first down and was sandwiched between three defenders.  He did not return to the game and was replaced by Nate Longshore.

Best had his second fumble of the game in the second quarter, but Sean Cattouse then intercepted Masoli to negate it.  The Bears fumbled again on a rushing attempt by Shane Vereen but the Ducks were stopped cold on a fourth down conversion attempt in Cal territory. The only score of the quarter was set up by a 50-yard interception return by Worrell Williams, capped off by a 2-yard pass from Longshore to Nyan Boateng.

Both teams traded field goals in third quarter until the Ducks blitzed down the field from their own 45-yard line and scored with three plays in 33 seconds on a 17-yard run by running back Jeremiah Johnson for their final score of the game. In the fourth quarter, Ducks cornerback Jairus Bryd fumbled a punt which was recovered by the Bears, allowing Vereen to score on a 2-yard run to put the game away.

Jeremiah Johnson went over the century mark with a 117 yards rushing, including a touchdown, the second rusher to do so against the Bears. Masoli himself had 97 rushing yards, more than double his 44 passing yards, including a touchdown run. For the Bears, Longshore finished with a 136 passing yards including one touchdown, while Best had 93 rushing yards.

Stanford

Last year Oregon scored 55 against the Cardinal in California and have not lost to Stanford since 2001.

Oregon jumped out to a 17–3 early lead and led 20–17 at the half on a rain soaked field in Autzen Stadium.  The Ducks had to rally and score a touchdown on a 7-yard run by LeGarrette Blount with 6 seconds left to pull out a 35–28 win.  That brought the Ducks 2008 record to 7–3 but was not enough to return the Ducks to the top 25.

Arizona

The Ducks will look to avenge the loss suffered when they traveled to Tucson and became one of many #2 ranked teams to lose last season.  Oregon's last win against Arizona came in 2005

The Oregon Ducks started hot against the Arizona Wildcats in Eugene, with Jeremiah Masoli getting a career-high in rushing touchdowns (3) and broke the record for an Oregon quarterback in this category in a single Ducks game. He also had two passing touchdowns, all five in the first half. Oregon led at the half, 45–17, but Arizona started the second half hot. The Wildcats managed to hold the Ducks to merely ten points in the second half, while they had a 21-point fourth quarter to pull within three. However, a 40-yard touchdown hit from Masoli to LeGarrette Blounte sealed the Ducks win, 55–45, to avenge a loss to the Wildcats from last year.

This game was the first in which the Ducks wore their new "blackout" jerseys and black helmets, to fit with the Autzen Stadium "blackout" theme for the game.

Oregon State

Beavers won at Oregon for the first time since 1993 last year, ending a ten-year run of the home team winning in the series. This season the game is in Corvallis, a place the Ducks have not won at since 1996. The stakes for this game were recently raised – if the Ducks win, they will place second in the PAC-10 and will more than likely receive a Holiday Bowl berth. If the Beavers won, they would receive their first Rose Bowl berth since 1964, by virtue of their earlier win over Southern California.

None of that happened however, as Oregon gained 694 yards on 69 plays, a 10.1-yard-per-play average. The loss was a Civil War record for points allowed as well as yards allowed, and saw the Beavers fall from Rose Bowl hopefuls to being demoted to the third position in the Pac-10, playing in the Sun Bowl (won by the Beavers by a 3–0 score [sic]. The Ducks went on to win the Holiday Bowl over Oklahoma State, 42–31.

Holiday Bowl

This is the third trip to the Holiday Bowl for the Ducks this decade.  They beat Texas 35-30 in 2000, and lost to Oklahoma 17-14 in 2005.  This will be Oklahoma State's second Holiday Bowl and first since 1988, when their current head coach Mike Gundy started at quarterback and that year's Heisman Trophy winner Barry Sanders lined up in the backfield.  That team throttled Wyoming 62-14.  This will be the first-ever meeting between the Ducks and Cowboys.

Roster

Coaching staff
Mike Bellotti – head coach
Steve Greatwood – Offensive Line
Nick aliotti – Defensive Coordinator
Chip Kelly – Offensive Coordinator & Quarterbacks
Gary campbell – Running Backs
Michael gray – Defensive Line
John neal – Secondary
Tom osborne – Tight Ends & Special Teams
Don pellum – Linebackers & Recruiting Coordinator
Robin pflugrad – Wide Receivers
Jim radcliffe – Head Strength and Conditioning Coach
Eddy morrissey – Graduate Assistant Coach
Matt Dawson- Graduate Assistant Coach
Jeff hawkins – Assistant Athletic Director/Football Operations
Jim Fisher- Special Teams Intern

Rankings

Statistics

Team

Scores by quarter

Offense

Rushing

Passing

Receiving

Defense

Special teams

References

Oregon
Oregon Ducks football seasons
Holiday Bowl champion seasons
Oregon Ducks football